Jacob Rosecrants (born October 10, 1977) is an American politician who has served in the Oklahoma House of Representatives from the 46th district since 2017.
Jacob Rosecrants (born October 10, 1977) is an American politician who has served in the Oklahoma House of Representatives from the 46th district since 2017.

In January 2023, he filed legislation to repeal HB 1775, a law passed the prior session to ban teaching concepts proponents argue are critical race theory, after the bill was challenged in a lawsuit by the American Civil Liberties Union. Republican leadership stated they did not intend to hear the bill.

Electoral History

2016

2017

2018

2020

2022

References

1977 births
Living people
Politicians from Oklahoma City
Democratic Party members of the Oklahoma House of Representatives
21st-century American politicians